Clavaria rosea is a species of coral fungus in the family Clavariaceae. The arms are smooth, unbranched, pink, and have rounded tips. The spores are smooth, hyaline (translucent), inamyloid, pip-shaped, and measure 7–10 by 2–3 μm. Described in 1811 by Swedish physician and naturalist Johan Wilhelm Dalman, the species is found in Asia, Europe, and North America, where it grows singly on the ground in mixed forests.

References

External links

Clavariaceae
Fungi described in 1811
Fungi of Asia
Fungi of Europe
Fungi of North America